The 2006–07 National Division Three South was the seventh season (20th overall) of the fourth division (south) of the English domestic rugby union competition using the name National Division Three South.  New teams to the division only included promoted teams from lower leagues (there had been no relegation from the 2005–06 National Division Two) including Canterbury who came up as champions of London Division 1, while Chinnor (champions) and Clifton (playoffs) came up from South West Division 1.  The league system was 4 points for a win, 2 points for a draw and additional bonus points being awarded for scoring 4 or more tries and/or losing within 7 points of the victorious team. In terms of promotion the league champions would go straight up into National Division Two while the runners up would have a one-game playoff against the runners up from National Division Three North (at the home ground of the club with the superior league record) for the final promotion place.

In what was a close title race, Southend edged out Westcombe Park to take the title by just two points (and promotion to the 2007–08 National Division Two), despite the London side having a much superior for and against points record.  Westcombe Park would join Southend in the following seasons National Division Two by defeating 2006–07 National Division Three North runners up Tynedale at Goddington Dene in the promotion playoff.  At the other end of the table newly promoted Chinnor went straight back down as the first team to be relegated, followed closely by Cheltenham-based side Old Patesians.  Hertford were the final team to go down, being much more competitive but eventually finishing two points below 11th placed Clifton.  Chinnor and Old Patesians would join South West Division 1 while Hertford would fall to London Division 1.

Participating teams and locations

Final league table

Results

Round 1

Round 2

Round 3

Round 4

Round 5

Round 6

Round 7

Round 8

Round 9

Round 10

Round 11

Round 12

Round 13 

Postponed.  Game rescheduled to 10 March 2007.

Round 14 

Postponed.  Game rescheduled to 10 March 2007.

Round 15 

Postponed. Game rescheduled to 7 April 2007.

Round 16 

Postponed.  Game rescheduled to 10 March 2007.

Round 17 

Postponed.  Game rescheduled to 28 April 2007.

Round 18

Round 19

Round 20

Round 21 

Postponed.  Game rescheduled to 7 April 2007.

Rounds 13, 14 & 16  (rescheduled games) 

Game rescheduled from 16 December 2006.

Game rescheduled from 23 December 2006.

Game rescheduled from 13 January 2007.

Round 22

Round 23

Round 24

Rounds 15 & 21  (rescheduled games) 

Game rescheduled from 6 January 2007.

Game rescheduled from 3 March 2007.

Round 25

Round 26

Round 17 (rescheduled game) 

Game rescheduled from 27 January 2007.

Promotion play-off
The league runners up of National Division Three South and North would meet in a playoff game for promotion to National Division Two.  Westcombe Park were the southern division runners up and as they had a superior league record than northern runners-up, Tynedale, they hosted the play-off match.

Total season attendances

Individual statistics 

 Note that points scorers includes tries as well as conversions, penalties and drop goals.

Top points scorers

Top try scorers

Season records

Team
Largest home win — 78 pts
85 - 7 Westcombe Park at home to Hertford on 11 November 2006
Largest away win — 77 pts
85 - 8 Westcombe Park away to Chinnor on 7 October 2006
Most points scored — 85 pts (x2) 
85 - 8 Westcombe Park away to Chinnor on 7 October 2006
85 - 7 Westcombe Park at home to Hertford on 11 November 2006
Most tries in a match — 13
Westcombe Park at home to Hertford on 11 November 2006
Most conversions in a match — 11
Westcombe Park away to Chinnor on 7 October 2006
Most penalties in a match — 7 (x2)
Hertford at home to Rosslyn Park on 30 September 2006
Clifton at home to Lydney on 21 October 2006
Most drop goals in a match — 1
N/A - multiple teams

Player
Most points in a match — 30
 Andy Thorpe for North Walsham at home to Rosslyn Park on 14 April 2007
Most tries in a match — 6
 Andy Thorpe for North Walsham at home to Rosslyn Park on 14 April 2007
Most conversions in a match — 11
 James Whittingham for Westcombe Park away to Chinnor on 7 October 2006
Most penalties in a match — 7 (x2)
 Kieron Davies for Hertford at home to Rosslyn Park on 30 September 2006
 John Barnes for Clifton at home to Lydney on 21 October 2006
Most drop goals in a match — 1
N/A - multiple players

Attendances
Highest — 1,120 
Lydney at home to Cinderford on 17 March 2007
Lowest — 50 
Old Patesians at home to Hertford on 21 April 2007
Highest Average Attendance — 648
Bridgwater & Albion
Lowest Average Attendance — 96
Old Patesians

See also
 English rugby union system
 Rugby union in England

References

External links
 NCA Rugby

2006–07
2006–07 in English rugby union leagues